David E. Simon (born 1961/1962) is an American billionaire real estate developer, chairman and chief executive officer (CEO) of Indianapolis-based Simon Property Group, an S&P 100 company and the largest U.S. publicly traded commercial real estate company.

Early life and education
Simon is the son of Jewish American real estate developer and founder Melvin Simon and his first wife Bess (née Meshulam). He obtained a B.S. degree from Indiana University in 1983 and an M.B.A. from Columbia University's Graduate School of Business in 1985.

Career
Simon started his career at First Boston. From 1988 to 1990, he worked at Wasserstein Perella & Co. as a vice president.

In 1990, he joined Simon Property precursor Melvin Simon & Associates as Chief Financial Officer. In 1993, he led the efforts to take Simon Property Group public with a nearly $1 billion initial public offering that, at the time, was the largest real estate stock offering. He became CEO in 1995 and chairman in 2007.

He is a former chairman of the National Association of Real Estate Investment Trusts (NAREIT) leadership team and is a former trustee of the International Council of Shopping Centers (ICSC). In 2000, he was inducted into the Indiana University Kelley School of Business Academy of Alumni Fellows.

Philanthropy
In 2013, he donated $5 million support the construction Columbia Business School's new facilities.

Personal life
In 1986, he married Jacqueline Susan Freed. They have five children.

References

Place of birth missing (living people)
Living people
American chief executives
Jewish American philanthropists
American billionaires
Indiana University alumni
Columbia Business School alumni
1960s births
Simon family (real estate)
Simon Property Group people
21st-century American Jews